George Marvin Johnson Jr. (April 11, 1918 – July 9, 2021) was a United States Air Force major general who served as chief, Military Assistance Advisory Group in Italy. He was a graduate of the North Georgia College, University of Maryland and George Washington University. Johnson turned 100 in April 2018 and died in Florida in July 2021 at the age of 103.

References

1918 births
2021 deaths
American centenarians
Men centenarians
United States Air Force generals
People from Fort Valley, Georgia